In the United States Congress, an enrolled bill is the final copy of a bill or joint resolution which has passed both houses of Congress in identical form.

In the United States, enrolled bills are engrossed—prepared in a formally printed copy—and must be signed by the presiding officers of both houses and sent to the president of the United States for approval. The practice of engrossing a handwritten copy in the style of an illuminated manuscript fell out of favor in the 1790s. The 1789 Constitution of the United States did receive this treatment.

See also
 Enrolled bill rule

References

Terminology of the United States Congress